2015 Rugby Europe Women's Sevens Olympic Repechage Tournament. Spain won the tournament and qualified for the 2016 Rugby World Women's Sevens Olympic Repechage Tournament along with runner-up Ireland and third place Portugal.

Final repechage tournament
Teams qualified for the tournament based on their performances in the 2015 Rugby Europe Women's Sevens Championships.

  (Grand Prix 3rd place)
  (Grand Prix 5th place)
  (Grand Prix 6th place)
  (Grand Prix 8th place)
  (Grand Prix 9th place)
  (Grand Prix 10th place)
  (Grand Prix 12th place)
  (Division A winner)
  (Division A runner-up)
  (Division A 3rd place)
  (Division A 4th place)
  (Division B winner)

Pool stage

Pool A

Pool B

Pool C

Knockout stage

Bowl

Plate

Cup

Repechage standings

References

See also
 2015 Rugby Europe Sevens Olympic Repechage Tournament

International rugby union competitions hosted by Portugal
Europe
2015–16 in European women's rugby union
2015 rugby sevens competitions
2015 in Portuguese women's sport
Rugby
2015
July 2015 sports events in Europe